Matilde Marín (born 1948) is a contemporary Argentine artist who works in photography, engraving and video.

Early life and education 
Matilde Marín grew up in Buenos Aires and obtained her degree in sculpture at the School of Fine Arts Prilidiano Pueyrredon from Buenos Aires. She continued her education in engraving at the Kunstgewerbeschule - Zurich University of the Arts.

She has received the Platinum Konex Award in engraving (1992) and in printmaking (2002).

Work 
Marin stated that her role as an artist is to be an active witness of historical and social events. She creates work about the world we inhabit, situations that relate to climate change, and the natural or artificial alteration of landscape. She began working under printmaking media and during the early 1990's shifted her practice working exclusively with video, photography.

During the 1980's Marín was deeply involved in the graphic world, focusing on exploring non-conventional media and introducing different techniques for printing and book work. In 1984 she created Grupo Seis with the artist Alicia Díaz Rinaldi with the intention of breaking the boundaries of printmaking media. The group was invited as guest of honor by Art Historian Mari Carmen Ramírez to take part in the Puerto Rico Biennial (1988).

Marín took part in the Cuenca Biennial in Ecuador (2001), Curitiba Biennial in Brazil (2015), Jerusalem Biennial in Israel (2015), Karachi Biennale in Pakistan (2017), Bienal Sur in Argentina (2019), Havana Biennial in Cuba (2019), Bienal Sur in Saudi Arabia (2021).

Selected solo exhibitions 
 2022 25FPS at Galería Del Infinito Arte Buenos Aires, Argentina
 2019 Cuando divise el Humo Azul de Ítaca at Galería Del Infinito Arte, Buenos Aires, Argentina
 2017 Arqueología de sí misma at Fundación OSDE, Buenos Aires, Argentina
 2016 Paisajes Indeterminados at Galería Patricia Ready, Santiago de Chile Chile
 2014 Una línea continua, temas sobre el paisaje at Museo Nacional de Bellas Artes, Neuquén, Argentina

Selected collections 

 MALBA - The Latin American Art Museum of Buenos Aires, Argentina
 Art Museum of the Americas, Washington DC.
 Citi Bank Art Collection, New York, NY
 Bienal de Cuenca, Ecuador

Personal life 
Marin has lived in Venezuela, United States, Switzerland and has lived in Buenos Aires since 1980.

References 

Argentine engravers
Artists from Buenos Aires
Women engravers
1948 births
Living people
Argentine video artists
Zurich University of the Arts alumni
Argentine women photographers
Women video artists